As defined by the German Federal Institute for Research on Building, Urban Affairs and Spatial Development, a Großstadt (large city) is a city with more than 100,000 inhabitants. As of December 31, 2015, 79 cities in Germany fulfill this criterion and are listed here. This list refers only to the population of individual municipalities within their defined limits, which does not include other municipalities or suburban areas within urban agglomerations or metropolitan areas.

List 
The following table lists the 80 cities in Germany with a population of at least 100,000 each on December 31, 2021, as estimated by the Federal Statistical Office of Germany. A city is displayed in bold if it is a state or federal capital, and in italics if it is the most populous city in the state. The table below contains the following information:
 The city rank by population as of December 31, 2021, as estimated by the Federal Statistical Office of Germany
 The city name
 The name of the state in which the city lies
 The city population as of December 31, 2021, as estimated by the Federal Statistical Office of Germany
 The city population as of December 31, 2015, as estimated by the Federal Statistical Office of Germany
 The city percentage population change from December 31, 2015 to December 31, 2021
 The change in city rank by population from December 31, 2015 to December 31, 2021
 The city land area as of December 31, 2021
 The city population density as of December 31, 2021 (residents per unit of land area)
 The city latitude and longitude coordinates.

Schwerin is the only state capital not listed.

Gallery

See also 
 List of cities and towns in Germany
 List of towns and cities in Germany by historical population
 List of municipalities in Germany
 Metropolitan regions in Germany

References 

Cities
Cities

Germany

az:Almaniya şəhərlərinin siyahısı
bg:Списък на градовете в Германия
cs:Seznam měst v Německu
el:Κατάλογος πόλεων της Γερμανίας
eu:Alemaniako hiri nagusien zerrenda
ko:독일의 인구순 도시 목록
sw:Orodha ya miji ya Ujerumani
sk:Zoznam miest v Nemecku
vi:Danh sách những thành phố lớn của Đức